Smith is an American drama television series that premiered on September 19, 2006, at 10:00 p.m. ET on CBS, created by John Wells. The series was canceled after only three episodes had aired.

Plot
The show follows a group of professional thieves who struggle to keep their work separate from the rest of their lives. The leader of the group Bobby Stevens seeks to end his criminal ways after a few more big scores. His plan is not successful and his wife Hope becomes suspicious. Bobby has a day job as a salesman for a paper cup manufacturer, which allows him to travel frequently. Each episode portrays a robbery or preparation for other jobs the thieves plan to undertake. Ongoing subplots examine each of the characters' double lives, a necessity in order to stay one step ahead of the authorities and shield their families.

Cast
 Ray Liotta as Bobby Stevens
 Virginia Madsen as Hope Stevens
 Simon Baker as Jeff Breen
 Jonny Lee Miller as Tom
 Franky G as Joe Garcia
 Amy Smart as Annie
 Chris Bauer as Agent Dodd
 Shohreh Aghdashloo as Charlie

Broadcast
The show was called "The worst new show of the season," by USA Today and was canceled on October 6, 2006 after only three airings, becoming the first new show of the 2006–07 television season to be canceled.

In the UK, the show was also scheduled to be seen during the 2006 season, on ITV4. ITV4 rebroadcast the series in March 2007. It was later shown on Hallmark in August 2007 with all seven episodes airing.

The entire series (including the four episodes that never aired on CBS) was available on the network's Innertube broadband video section for a few weeks. Warner Bros. Television made all seven episodes (with a synopsis for the plotted eighth through twelfth episodes) available via digital download in November 2006 on Apple's iTunes Store, AOL, and Amazon.

Episodes

References

External links
 

CBS original programming
2000s American drama television series
2006 American television series debuts
2006 American television series endings
Television series by Warner Bros. Television Studios
Television shows set in Pittsburgh
Fictional portrayals of the Pittsburgh Bureau of Police
Television series about organized crime